Patria o Muerte, Venceremos is an official national motto of Cuba, adopted in 1960.

The origin of the motto was derived from a speech by revolutionary leader Fidel Castro to commemorate the workers and soldiers who died in the La Coubre explosion on March 5, 1960 at the harbour in Havana. The motto was originally written as Patria o Muerte ("Homeland or death"), with the word Venceremos ("we will prevail") added in July 1960 during the Congress of the National Federation of Barber and Hairdressing Workers.

References

See also 
Patria y Vida
Workers of the world, unite!

National mottos
Politics of Cuba
National symbols of Cuba